Glaucippe (Ancient Greek: Γλαυκίππη), in Greek mythology, is a name that may refer to:

Glaucippe, a Libyan princess as one of the Danaïdes, 50 daughters of King Danaus and the naiad Polyxo. She married (and murdered) Potamon, son of Aegyptus and Caliadne. This Glaucippe is also mentioned by Hyginus. Due to his list of Danaids and Aegyptiads being poorly preserved, her husband's name is almost illegible here: *Niavius.
Glaucippe, daughter of Xanthus and possible mother of Hecuba.

Notes

References 

 Apollodorus, The Library with an English Translation by Sir James George Frazer, F.B.A., F.R.S. in 2 Volumes, Cambridge, MA, Harvard University Press; London, William Heinemann Ltd. 1921. ISBN 0-674-99135-4. Online version at the Perseus Digital Library. Greek text available from the same website.
 Gaius Julius Hyginus, Fabulae from The Myths of Hyginus translated and edited by Mary Grant. University of Kansas Publications in Humanistic Studies. Online version at the Topos Text Project.

Danaids
Princesses in Greek mythology
it:Danaidi#Nomi